The Dar-es-Salaam dwarf gecko (Lygodactylus inexpectatus) is a species of gecko endemic to Tanzania.

References

Lygodactylus
Reptiles described in 1965
Endemic fauna of Tanzania
Reptiles of Tanzania